COWSEL (COntrolled Working SpacE Language) is a programming language designed between 1964 and 1966 by Robin Popplestone. It was based on an RPN form of Lisp combined with some ideas from CPL.

COWSEL was initially implemented on a Ferranti Pegasus computer at the University of Leeds and on a Stantec Zebra at the Bradford Institute of Technology; later, Rod Burstall implemented it on an Elliot 4120 at the University of Edinburgh.

COWSEL was renamed POP-1 during the summer of 1966 and development continued under that name from then on.

Example code
 function member
 lambda x y
 comment Is x a member of list y;
 define      y atom then *0 end
             y hd x equal then *1 end
             y tl -> y repeat up

Note that keywords were also underlined in the original printouts. Popplestone used a Flexowriter with underscoring for syntax highlighting.

See also
 POP-2 programming language
 POP-11 programming language
 Poplog programming environment

References
 Technical report: EPU-R-12, U Edinburgh (Apr 1966)

External links
 "The Early Development of POP" on The Encyclopedia of Computer Languages

Functional languages
History of computing in the United Kingdom
Programming languages created in 1964
Programming languages